The 1879 City of Nelson by-election was a by-election held on 6 February 1879 in the  electorate during the 6th New Zealand Parliament.

The by-election was caused by the resignation of the incumbent MP John Sharp.

The by-election was won by Acton Adams. He was described as the “Secularist” candidate; as with David Goldie in the 1879 City of Auckland West by-election; both favouring secular not denominational education.

The following table gives the election result:

References

Nelson 1879
1879 elections in New Zealand
Politics of Nelson, New Zealand